The 8th Cruiser Squadron  was a temporary formation of cruisers of the British Royal Navy from 1912 to 1914. and again from 1924/25 to 1942.

The Royal Navy's cruiser squadrons contained a maximum of five to six ships but down as low as two to three ships. From 1914 they were usually designated as Light Cruiser Squadrons, while after 1925 they were re-designated Cruiser Squadrons.

History

First Formation
The 8th Cruiser Squadron was a temporary naval unit attached to the Third Fleet. The then Admiral of Patrols, Rear-Admiral J. M. de Robeck, assumed command on 26 July 1914, (for Test Mobilisation), however the squadron was never officially constituted. De Robeck was then given command of the 9th Cruiser Squadron also known as Cruiser Force I on 4 August 1914.

Second Formation
In 1924/25 the 8th Light Cruiser Squadron was re-designated 8th Cruiser Squadron and came under the direct command of the Commander-in-Chief  North America and West Indies until 1942.

Rear/Vice-Admiral commanding

First Formation

Squadron disbanded

Second formation
Of note: The squadron was under direct command of the Commander-in-Chief, North America and West Indies

Notes

References 
 Tennyson, Brian Douglas; Sarty, Roger (2000). Guardian of the Gulf: Sydney, Cape Breton, and the Atlantic Wars. Toronto, Canada: University of Toronto Press. .
 Tucker, Spencer; Wood, Laura Matysek; Murphy, Justin D. (1999). The European Powers in the First World War: An Encyclopedia. Oxford, England: Taylor & Francis. .
 Watson, Dr Graham. (2015) "Royal Navy Organization and Ship Deployments 1900-1914". www.naval-history.net. Gordon Smith.
 Watson, Dr Graham. (2015) "Royal Navy Organization and Ship Deployment, Inter-War Years 1919-1939: 6. CRUISER DEPLOYMENT 1919-1939". www.naval-history.net. Gordon Smith.
 Watson, Dr Gordon. (2015) "Royal Navy Organization in World War 2, 1939-1945: AMERICA AND WEST INDIES COMMAND, 1939-1942". www.naval-history.net. Gordon Smith.

Cruiser squadrons of the Royal Navy
Ship squadrons of the Royal Navy in World War I